Kurikoma Dam is a multi-purpose gravity dam in the city of Kurihara, Miyagi, Japan, completed in 1962.

References 

Dams in Miyagi Prefecture
Dams completed in 1962
Kurihara, Miyagi
Hydroelectric power stations in Japan